Vilamarí is a village in the province of Girona and autonomous community of Catalonia, Spain.

See also
Agustí Riera i Pau

References

Populated places in Pla de l'Estany